Sebastian Buff (c.1829–1880) was a Swiss portrait painter.

Life

Buff was born in 1829. He studied painting with the portraitist Leonhard Tanner in St Gallen, before continuing his education  at Munich and Paris. Besides portraits he painted genre works which were much sought after. He died at Herisau in 1880.

References

Sources
 

19th-century Swiss painters
Swiss male painters
Swiss portrait painters
1828 births
1880 deaths
19th-century Swiss male artists